São João Batista or São João Baptista (Portuguese for Saint John the Baptist) may refer to the following places:

In Brazil

São João Batista, Maranhão 
São João Batista, Santa Catarina
São João Batista do Glória, Minas Gerais

In Cape Verde
São João Baptista (Ribeira Grande de Santiago), a parish on the island of Santiago
São João Baptista (Boa Vista), a parish on the island of Boa Vista
São João Baptista (Santo Antão), a parish on the island of Santo Antão
São João Baptista (Brava), a parish on the island of Brava
São João Baptista (Santo Antão), a parish on the island of Santo Antão

In Benin
Ouidah, a city that includes Fort of São João Baptista de Ajudá, a tiny Portuguese enclave occupied by Benin in 1961.

In Portugal

São João Baptista (Beja), a former parish in the municipality of Beja
Santiago Maior - São João Baptista (Beja), a parish in the municipality of Beja since 2013
São João Baptista (Campo Maior), a parish in the municipality of Campo Maior 
São João Baptista (Castelo de Vide), a parish in the municipality of Castelo de Vide
São João Baptista (Entroncamento), a parish in the municipality of Entroncamento
São João Baptista (Moura), a parish in the municipality of Moura
São João Baptista (Porto de Mós), a parish in the municipality of Porto de Mós 
São João Baptista (Tomar), a parish in the municipality of Tomar
São João Baptista de Airão, a parish in the municipality of Guimarães